Cahaya LRT station is a Malaysian low-rise rapid transit station situated near and named after the nearby Taman Cahaya (Malay; English: Cahaya Estate (Cahaya means light), in Ampang Jaya, Selangor. The station is part of the Ampang Line (formerly known as STAR, and the Ampang and Sri Petaling Lines), and was opened on December 16, 1996, as part of the first phase of the STAR system's opening, alongside 13 adjoining stations along the Sultan Ismail-Ampang route.

Location
Cahaya station is named after the Ampang Jaya locality of Taman Cahaya, and is stationed in an area bordering the suburbs of Pandan Indah towards the south, and Taman Cahaya and Taman Cahaya Indah (Lovely Cahaya Estate) towards the north. The station is also accessible from Taman Nirvana (Nirvana Estate) north and Kampung Baru Ampang (Ampang New Village) south. The station is linked to two roadways: One backroad off Jalan Cahaya 7 (Cahaya Road 7) from Taman Cahaya Indah and another off Jalan Pandan Cahaya 1/2 (Pandan Cahaya Road 1/2) from Pandah Indah.

The Cahaya station was constructed along two leveled tracks, reusing the now defunct Federated Malay States Railway and Malayan Railway route between Kuala Lumpur, Ampang town and Salak South. The station is also located a mere 470 metres away from the neighbouring Cempaka station, which serves roughly the same locality.

Design

Cahaya station stands as a low-rise station along two tracks for trains traveling in opposite direction. However, the station was constructed as a subsurface structure significantly lower than most other conventional subsurface stations in the Ampang Line, mainly those along the Miharja-Cahaya route. Initially, the station itself was not constructed with any public walkway running underneath the tracks and platforms, as other subsurface stations along the route have. However, an overhead bridge and elevators were built later. Patrons are also provided with stairways on opposite sides of the track of a road-based flyover (Jalan Cahaya 1; Cahaya Road 1) over the tracks just northeast. The station's lower height may be attributed to the aforementioned flyover constructed close to the station, restricting the height of the adjoining tracks towards the Ampang terminal, thus affecting the height of the station.

As the station is subsurface and features two side platforms, the station designates individual ticketing areas for each of the station's two platforms at their level, ensuring any access to trains traveling the opposite direction is not freely possible. The principal styling of the station is similar to most other stations in the line, featuring curved roofs supported by latticed frames, and white plastered walls and pillars. Because stairways are only used to link street level with the station's ticket areas and platforms, the station is not accommodative to disabled users.

See also

 List of rail transit stations in Klang Valley

External links 
Cahaya LRT Station - mrt.com.my

Ampang Line
Railway stations opened in 1996
1996 establishments in Malaysia